Tigliole is a comune (municipality) in the Province of Asti in the Italian region Piedmont, located about  southeast of Turin and about  west of Asti.

The municipality of Tigliole contains the frazioni (subdivisions, mainly villages and hamlets) Valperosa, Pocola, Pratomorone, Remondini, and San Carlo.

Tigliole borders the following municipalities: Asti, Baldichieri d'Asti, Cantarana, San Damiano d'Asti, and Villafranca d'Asti.

Demographic evolution

References

External links
 www.provincia.asti.it/comuni/tigliole/homepage.htm

Cities and towns in Piedmont